Aguilar de Montuenga is a village under the local government of the municipality of Arcos de Jalón, Soria, Spain.

References

Populated places in the Province of Soria
Towns in Spain